Robert Brush  (March 8, 1875 – April 23, 1944) was a Major League Baseball catcher.

External links 

1875 births
1944 deaths
Boston Doves players
Major League Baseball first basemen
Baseball players from Iowa
Cedar Rapids (minor league baseball) players
Moorhead Barmaids players
St. Paul Saints (Western League) players
People from Osage, Iowa